John O'Donnell (8 June 1947 – 13 November 2018) was an Australian rules footballer who played with St Kilda in the Victorian Football League (VFL).

He sustained a knee injury after taking a high mark over Ross Dunne, and contracted golden staph from the subsequent operation. The infection was severe, and he was unable to make a return to the VFL.

O'Donnell's cousin, Simon O'Donnell, was a cricketer for Australia and Victoria and also played VFL football for St Kila.

Notes

External links 

1947 births
Australian rules footballers from Victoria (Australia)
St Kilda Football Club players
People educated at Xavier College
2018 deaths